There have been ten baronetcies created for persons with the surname Mackenzie, seven in the Baronetage of Nova Scotia and three in the Baronetage of the United Kingdom. Four of the creations are extant as of 2010.

Mackenzie baronets, of Tarbat (1628/1704)
The Mackenzie Baronetcy, of Tarbat in the County of Ross, was created in the Baronetage of Nova Scotia on 21 May 1628 for John Mackenzie. His son, the second Baronet, was created Earl of Cromarty in 1703. He resigned the baronetcy in favour of his younger son Kenneth, who was created a baronet in the Baronetage of Nova Scotia on 29 April 1704, with remainder to his heirs male whatsoever and with the precedence of 1628. The third Baronet was one of the Scottish representatives to the 1st Parliament of Great Britain and later represented Cromartyshire. The fourth Baronet was Member of Parliament for Cromartyshire. In 1744 he succeeded to the Mackenzie Baronetcy of Roystoun on the death of his uncle Sir James Mackenzie, 1st Baronet, of Roystoun (see below). On the death of the fifth/third Baronet in 1763 the next heir was under attainder and the baronetcies were consequently forfeited.
Sir John Mackenzie, 1st Baronet (died 1654)
George Mackenzie, 1st Earl of Cromartie, 2nd Baronet (1630–1714) (created Earl of Cromarty in 1703 – resigned baronetcy in 1704 in favour of third Baronet)
Sir Kenneth Mackenzie, 3rd Baronet (–1728)
Sir George Mackenzie, 4th Baronet (died 1748)
Sir Kenneth Mackenzie, 5th Baronet (died 1763)

Mackenzie baronets, of Coul (1673)

The Mackenzie Baronetcy, of Coul in the County of Ross, was created in the Baronetage of Nova Scotia on 16 October 1673 for Kenneth Mackenzie. His father Alexander Mackenzie of Coul was the illegitimate son of Colin Cam Mackenzie, 11th of Kintail, and half-brother of Kenneth Mackenzie, 1st Lord Mackenzie of Kintail, ancestor of the Earls of Seaforth, and of Sir Roderick Mackenzie, ancestor of the Earls of Cromarty. The third Baronet was involved in the Jacobite rising of 1715. He was attainted with the baronetcy forfeited.

However, the baronetcy has since been assumed by descendants of the brother of the third Baronet. It is claimed that the attainder did not include collateral branches. The tenth Baronet was Premier of Queensland. The Right Reverend Henry Mackenzie, Suffragan Bishop of Nottingham, was the youngest son of John Mackenzie, third in descent from Simon Mackenzie, second son of the first Baronet. The presumed thirteenth and present Baronet has not successfully proven his succession and is therefore not on the Official Roll of the Baronetage.
Sir Kenneth Mackenzie, 1st Baronet (-c. 1680)
Sir Alexander Mackenzie, 2nd Baronet (died 1702)
Sir John Mackenzie, 3rd Baronet (-c. 1715)
Sir Colin Mackenzie, 4th Baronet (1674–1740)
Sir Alexander Mackenzie, 5th Baronet (died 1792)
Sir Alexander Mackenzie, 6th Baronet (died 1796)
Sir George Steuart Mackenzie, 7th Baronet (1780–1848)
Sir Alexander Mackenzie, 8th Baronet (1805–1856)
Sir William Mackenzie, 9th Baronet (1806–1868)
Sir Robert Ramsay Mackenzie, 10th Baronet (1811–1873)
Sir Arthur George Ramsay Mackenzie, 11th Baronet (1865–1935)
Sir Robert Evelyn Mackenzie, 12th Baronet (1906–1990)
Peter Douglas Mackenzie, presumed 13th Baronet (born 1949)

Mackenzie baronets, of Darien (1703)
The Mackenzie Baronetcy, of Darien in the County of Ross, was created in the Baronetage of Nova Scotia on 22 February 1703 for Alexander Mackenzie. The title became dormant on the early death of the fifth Baronet in 1839.
Sir Alexander Mackenzie, 1st Baronet (1663–1744)
Sir George Mackenzie, 2nd Baronet (1711-)
Sir George Udney Mackenzie, 3rd Baronet (1747–1815)
Sir Arthur Mackenzie, 4th Baronet (1782–1836)
Sir George Mackenzie, 5th Baronet (1811–1839)

Mackenzie, later Inglis baronets, of Gairloch (1703)
The Mackenzie, later Inglis Baronetcy, of Gairloch in the County of Ross, was created in Baronetage of Nova Scotia on 22 February 1703. For more information on this creation, see Inglis baronets.

Mackenzie baronets, of Scatwell (1703)
The Mackenzie Baronetcy, of Scatwell in the County of Ross, was created in the Baronetage of Nova Scotia on 22 February 1703 for Kenneth Mackenzie, who represented Ross-shire in the Scottish Parliament. He was a descendant of Kenneth Mackenzie, brother of the first Baronet of the 1628 creation. The fifth Baronet represented Ross-shire in the British Parliament and was Lord Lieutenant of Ross-shire. The presumed tenth and eleventh Baronets never successfully proved their succession and neither has the presumed twelfth and present Baronet, with the baronetcy considered dormant since 1972. The Mackenzie baronets of Tarbat is a collateral branch of the Mackenzie Earls of Cromarty and the present Baronet claims he is the representative as heir male collateral of Sir John Mackenzie, 1st Baronet, of Tarbat (see above).
Sir Kenneth Mackenzie, 1st Baronet (died 1730)
Sir Roderick Mackenzie, 2nd Baronet (–1750)
Sir Lewis Mackenzie, 3rd Baronet (1715–1756)
Sir Roderick Mackenzie, 4th Baronet (c. 1740–1811)
Sir James Wemyss Mackenzie, 5th Baronet (1770–1843)
Sir James John Randoll Mackenzie, 6th Baronet (1814–1884)
Sir James Dixon Mackenzie, 7th Baronet (1830–1900)
Sir James Kenneth Douglas Mackenzie, 8th Baronet (1859–1930)
Sir Lewis Roderick Kenneth Mackenzie, 9th Baronet (1902–1972)
Roderick Campbell Mackenzie, presumed 10th Baronet (1954–1981)
Roderick Edward Francois McQuhae Mackenzie, presumed 11th Baronet (1894–1986)
Roderick McQuhae Mackenzie, presumed 12th Baronet (born 1942)

Mackenzie baronets, of Royston (1704)
The Mackenzie Baronetcy, of Royston in the County of Edinburgh, was created in the Baronetage of Nova Scotia on 8 February 1704 for James Mackenzie. He was a younger son of George Mackenzie, 1st Earl of Cromartie, and the brother of Sir Kenneth Mackenzie, 3rd Baronet, of Tarbat (see above). On his death in 1744 the title was passed on to his nephew Sir George Mackenzie, 4th Baronet, of Tarbat, who became the second Baronet (see above). On the death of the fifth/third Baronet in 1763 the next heir was under attainder and the baronetcies were consequently forfeited.
Sir James Mackenzie, 1st Baronet (–1744)
George Mackenzie (1708–1744)
Sir George Mackenzie, 4th/2nd Baronet (died 1748)
Sir Kenneth Mackenzie, 5th/3rd Baronet (died 1763)

Baillie, later Mackenzie baronets, of Berkeley Square (1819)
The Baillie, later Mackenzie Baronetcy, of Berkeley Square in the County of London, was created in the Baronetage of the United Kingdom on 26 May 1819 for General Ewen Baillie, provisional Commander-in-Chief of The Bengal, with remainder in default of male issue of his own to his nephew and the male issue of his body. Baillie had already been created a baronet, of Portman Square in the County of London, on 11 December 1812, with normal remainder to the heirs male of his body. The 1812 creation became extinct on his death in 1820 while the 1819 creation was passed on according to the special remainder to his nephew Alexander Mackenzie, the second Baronet. He was the son of Roderick Mackenzie and his wife, the half-sister of the first Baronet. Mackenzie was also a General in the British Army. He was childless and the 1819 creation became extinct on his death in 1853.
Sir Ewen Mackenzie, 1st Baronet (died 1820)
Sir Alexander Mackenzie, 2nd Baronet (–1853)

Mackenzie baronets, of Kilcoy (1836)
The Mackenzie Baronetcy, of Kilcoy in the County of Ross, was created in the Baronetage of the United Kingdom on 15 March 1836 for Colin Mackenzie. He was a descendant of Alexander Mackenzie, son of the aforementioned Sir Colin "Cam" Mackenzie. The title became extinct on the death of the second Baronet in 1883.
Sir Colin Mackenzie, 1st Baronet (1782–1845)
Sir Evan Mackenzie, 2nd Baronet (1816–1883)

Mackenzie baronets, of Glen Muick (1890)

The Mackenzie Baronetcy, of Glen Muick (pronounced "Mick") in the County of Aberdeen, was created in the Baronetage of the United Kingdom on 21 March 1890 for James Mackenzie, a Deputy Lieutenant for Ross-shire and Middlesex. The third Baronet was a Colonel in the Scots Guards and courtier. The presumed fifth Baronet has not successfully proven his succession and is consequently not on the Official Roll of the Baronetage.
Sir James Thompson Mackenzie, 1st Baronet (1818–1890)
Sir Allan Russell Mackenzie, 2nd Baronet (1850–1906)
Sir Victor Audley Falconer Mackenzie, 3rd Baronet (1882–1944)
Sir (Alexander George Anthony) Allan Mackenzie, 4th Baronet (1913–1993)
(James William) Guy Mackenzie, presumed 5th Baronet (born 1946)

The heir presumptive is the presumed Baronet's brother Allan Walter Mackenzie (born 1952). There is no further heir to the title.

See also
Muir-Mackenzie baronets

References

Kidd, Charles, Williamson, David (editors). Debrett's Peerage and Baronetage (1990 edition). New York: St Martin's Press, 1990.

External links
History of the Mackenzies

Baronetcies in the Baronetage of Nova Scotia
Baronetcies in the Baronetage of the United Kingdom
Extinct baronetcies in the Baronetage of the United Kingdom
Baronetcies created with special remainders
Clan Mackenzie
1628 establishments in Nova Scotia
1819 establishments in the United Kingdom
Dormant baronetcies in the Baronetage of Nova Scotia
Forfeited baronetcies